was daimyō of Owari Domain during early Edo period Japan.

Biography
Tokugawa Mitsutomo was the eldest son of the first daimyō of Owari Domain, Tokugawa Yoshinao by a concubine. He undertook his genpuku ceremony under Shōgun Tokugawa Iemitsu on May 3, 1630, and was given the adult name of the "Mitsuyoshi", which included the same kanji "Mitsu" as the Shōgun. As a further sign of favor, his official wife, Chiyohime later Reisen-in, was also the daughter of shōgun Tokugawa Iemitsu. His childhood name was Gorōta (五郎太).

On the death of his father on June 28, 1650, he became the 2rd Tokugawa daimyō of Owari Domain, with lower 3rd court rank and the courtesy title of Captain of the Right Imperial Guards. He completed the clan mortuary temple of Kenchu-ji the following year, and was raised to upper 3rd court rank and Chūnagon on August 12, 1653.

On November 1, 1671, he formally changed his name to "Mitsutomo". On May 4, 1690, he received the courtesy title of Dainagon, and a week later was awarded 2nd Court Rank. On April 25, 1693, he officially retired, turning his offices and position as clan heed to his son, Tokugawa Tsunanari; however, although officially retired, he continued to wield all political power using his son's name, until his son's death on July 1, 1699. During this period, he lived at the Ōzone Oshitayashiki, a palatial palace with extensive gardens some distance from Nagoya Castle. He also had the Aoi Oshitayashiki constructed.

In addition to his official wife (a daughter of Shōgun Tokugawa Iemitsu), Mitsutomo had at least 10 official concubines, by whom he had 17 children (11 male, 6 female).

Noted for his accomplishments in the Japanese tea ceremony and Japanese calligraphy, Mitsutomo was especially noted as a master of the Shinkage-ryū style of Japanese swordsmanship, having been taught by the Owari Yagyū clan.  He proved so adept that he was named the 6th sōke by Yagyū Toshikane, and added a number of teaching concepts to the ryū.

His grave is at the Owari Tokugawa clan temple of Kenchū-ji in Nagoya.

Family
 Father: Tokugawa Yoshinao
 Mother: Ojo no Kata or Yoshida-dono
 Wife: Tokugawa Chiyohime, daughter of Tokugawa Iemitsu
 Concubines:
 Higuchi-dono
 Seshin'in
 Iyo-dono
 Ohisa no Kata
 Oito no Kata
 Otei no Kata
 Otsune no Kata
 Ofuchi no kata
 Umeda-dono
 Kimura-dono
 Children:
 Tokugawa Tsunanari by Chiyohime
 Matsudaira Yoshiyuki (1656–1715) by Chiyohime
 Toyohime (b.1655) by Chiyohime
 Naohime (1658–1661) by Chiyohime
 Matsudaira Yoshimasa (1651–1713) by Higuchi
 Matsudaira Yasunaga (1661–1675) by Seishin'in
 Atehime (1666–1683) married Asano Tsunanaga by Seishin'in
 Senosuke (b.1676) by Seishin'in
 Hachirotaro (1668–1669) by Iyo
 Matsudaira Tomoshige (1669–1702) by Iyo
 Chotakeru by Iyo
 Hidehime (b.1673) by Ohiya
 Nohime (b.1674) by Oito
 Mannosuke (1676–1681) by Otei
 Mannanosuke (b.1678) by Otsune
 Kannosuke (b.1677) by Ofuchi
 Matsudaira Tomoaki (1678–1728) by Umeda
 Motohime (1679–1690) by Kimura

References 

 Papinot, Edmond. (1906) Dictionnaire d'histoire et de géographie du japon. Tokyo: Librarie Sansaisha...Click link for digitized 1906 Nobiliaire du japon (2003)
 The content of much of this article was derived from that of the corresponding article on Japanese Wikipedia.

1625 births
1700 deaths
Lords of Owari
Tokugawa clan
Japanese swordfighters
17th-century Japanese calligraphers